Knocks Folly, also known as Janvier House and Barroll House, is a historic home located at Kennedyville, Kent County, Maryland, United States. It is an unusual combination of a small, -story, mid-18th-century log home with a three-story, Federal brick wing.

Knocks Folly was listed on the National Register of Historic Places in 1976.

References

External links
, including photo in 1975, at Maryland Historical Trust

Houses in Kent County, Maryland
Houses on the National Register of Historic Places in Maryland
Federal architecture in Maryland
National Register of Historic Places in Kent County, Maryland